The 1974 Brown Bears football team was an American football team that represented Brown University during the 1974 NCAA Division I football season. Brown finished fourth in the Ivy League. 

In their second season under head coach John Anderson, the Bears compiled a 5–4 record but were outscored 152 to 141. M. Sokolowski and B. Taylor were the team captains. 

The Bears' 4–3 conference record placed fourth in the Ivy League standings. They were outscored by Ivy opponents 92 to 86. 

Brown played its home games at Brown Stadium in Providence, Rhode Island.

Schedule

Roster

References

Brown
Brown Bears football seasons
Brown Bears football